Shaolin Sándor Liu (born 20 November 1995) is a Chinese-Hungarian Olympic champion short track speed skater.  He has won one gold and one bronze as part of the Hungarian team in short track speed skating relays at the 2018 and 2022 Winter Olympics.  He has chosen to change nationality that may allow him to compete for China in 2024.

Career
Born and raised in Hungary to a Chinese father and a Hungarian mother, Liu started the sport in 2006. Before taking up skating, Liu and his brother Shaoang swam for two years, but they frequently got colds as a result. After looking for different sports to compete in, they took up short track speed skating.

In 2006, the World Championships were held in Hungary. Their father assisted the Chinese team during their stay, helping with their stay and guiding them around. After the Chinese team suggested his two sons should go train in China due to their half-Chinese ethnicity, Liu's father agreed to take the boys to China, where they trained for one and a half years. After returning from China, they began to win various minor European competitions. In 2012, Zhang Jing came from China to coach Liu and his brother.

Liu represented Hungary at the 2014 Winter Olympics. He has won multiple medals at the World Junior Short Track Speed Skating Championships, and placed third overall at the 2016 World Short Track Speed Skating Championships.

He finished in fifth position at the 2018 Winter Olympics in the men's 1500 m event before winning gold in the 5000 m relay, which was also Hungary's first-ever Winter Olympics title. 

At the 2022 Winter Olympics held in Beijing, Liu was disqualified for an infringement despite finishing first in the men's 1000m final. He won a bronzein the mixed 2000 m relay.

In November 2022, Liu and his brother requested consent from the Hungarian National Skating Federation to allow them to change nationality, a request which was granted a month later in December, but they would need to sit out for 12 months with the change in nationality.

Personal life
Liu's younger brother Shaoang Liu is also a short track speed skater. He was second in the 1500 m, third in the 500 m, and fifth overall at the 2016 World Short Track Speed Skating Championships. Though born to a Chinese father from Tianjin, Liu speaks Chinese with a noticeable Northeastern accent due to his year and a half spent in the Northeastern region of China.
He was in a relationship with fellow speed skater Elise Christie from 2015 to 2018.

See also
List of Olympic medalist families

References

External links

1995 births
Living people
Hungarian male short track speed skaters
Olympic short track speed skaters of Hungary
Olympic medalists in short track speed skating
Olympic gold medalists for Hungary
Olympic bronze medalists for Hungary
Short track speed skaters at the 2014 Winter Olympics
Short track speed skaters at the 2018 Winter Olympics
Short track speed skaters at the 2022 Winter Olympics
Medalists at the 2018 Winter Olympics
Medalists at the 2022 Winter Olympics
World Short Track Speed Skating Championships medalists
Speed skaters from Budapest
Hungarian sportspeople of Chinese descent